Grady County is a county located in the U.S. state of Georgia. As of the 2020 census, the population was 26,236. The county seat is Cairo.

History 
Grady County was created by an act of the Georgia General Assembly on August 17, 1905, from portions of Decatur and Thomas Counties.

The county is named for Henry W. Grady, editor of the Atlanta Constitution and noted orator.

Geography 

The bulk of Grady County, centered on Cairo, is located on the Upper Ochlockonee River sub-basin of the larger Ochlockonee River basin. The county's northwestern corner is located in the Lower Flint River sub-basin of the ACF River Basin (Apalachicola-Chattahoochee-Flint River Basin). Grady County's western border, from Whigham south, and all of its southern border, is located in the Lower Ochlockonee River sub-basin of the same Ochlockonee River basin. Finally, a very small chunk of the county's southeastern portion, bisected by U.S. Route 319, is located in the Apalachee Bay-St. Marks sub-basin of the Ochlockonee River basin.

Grady County includes part of the Red Hills Region.

Major highways 

  U.S. Route 84
  U.S. Route 319
  State Route 35
  State Route 38
  State Route 38 Spur
  State Route 93
  State Route 111
  State Route 112
  State Route 188
  State Route 262

Adjacent counties 
 Mitchell County - north
 Thomas County - east
 Leon County, Florida - south
 Gadsden County, Florida - southwest
 Decatur County - west

Demographics

2000 census
As of the census of 2000, there were 23,659 people, 8,797 households, and 6,509 families living in the county.  The population density was 52 people per square mile (20/km2).  There were 9,991 housing units at an average density of 22 per square mile (8/km2).  The racial makeup of the county was 64.61% White, 30.15% Black or African American, 0.92% Native American, 0.30% Asian, 0.01% Pacific Islander, 3.20% from other races, and 0.81% from two or more races.  5.17% of the population were Hispanic or Latino of any race.

There were 8,797 households, out of which 34.10% had children under the age of 18 living with them, 53.10% were married couples living together, 16.20% had a female householder with no husband present, and 26.00% were non-families. 22.40% of all households were made up of individuals, and 10.70% had someone living alone who was 65 years of age or older.  The average household size was 2.66 and the average family size was 3.08.

In the county, the population was spread out, with 27.30% under the age of 18, 9.00% from 18 to 24, 27.90% from 25 to 44, 22.60% from 45 to 64, and 13.20% who were 65 years of age or older.  The median age was 36 years. For every 100 females there were 90.60 males.  For every 100 females age 18 and over, there were 87.40 males.

The median income for a household in the county was $28,656, and the median income for a family was $34,253. Males had a median income of $27,181 versus $20,128 for females. The per capita income for the county was $14,278.  About 16.70% of families and 21.30% of the population were below the poverty line, including 29.90% of those under age 18 and 19.80% of those age 65 or over.

2010 census
As of the 2010 United States Census, there were 25,011 people, 9,418 households, and 6,730 families living in the county. The racial makeup of the county was 62.8% white, 28.7% black or African American, 0.7% American Indian, 0.4% Asian, 0.1% Pacific islander, 5.7% from other races, and 1.6% from two or more races. Those of Hispanic or Latino origin made up 10.0% of the population. In terms of ancestry, 16.1% were American, 9.2% were English, and 8.6% were Irish.

Of the 9,418 households, 35.9% had children under the age of 18 living with them, 49.6% were married couples living together, 16.7% had a female householder with no husband present, 28.5% were non-families, and 24.3% of all households were made up of individuals. The average household size was 2.63 and the average family size was 3.10. The median age was 37.8 years.

The median income for a household in the county was $32,247 and the median income for a family was $39,159. Males had a median income of $32,396 versus $28,917 for females. The per capita income for the county was $17,785. About 22.0% of families and 25.9% of the population were below the poverty line, including 37.5% of those under age 18 and 18.7% of those age 65 or over.

2020 census

As of the 2020 United States Census, there were 26,236 people, 9,136 households, and 6,320 families residing in the county.

Education 
Grady County Schools operates public schools.

Communities

Cities
 Cairo
 Whigham

Census-designated place
 Calvary

Unincorporated communities
 Beachton

Politics

See also

 National Register of Historic Places listings in Grady County, Georgia
List of counties in Georgia

References

External links
 Grady County historical marker
 GeorgiaInfo Grady County Courthouse history
 The New Georgia Encyclopedia entry for Grady County 

 
Georgia (U.S. state) counties
1905 establishments in Georgia (U.S. state)
Populated places established in 1905